Ondřej Hotárek (born 25 January 1984) is a Czech-Italian pair skater and coach who began competing for Italy in 2006. He competed  with Valentina Marchei until the end of their partnership in 2018. With former partner Stefania Berton, he is the 2013 European bronze medalist, the 2013 Skate Canada International champion, and a three-time Italian national champion. Berton/Hotárek are the first Italian pair skaters to win European and Grand Prix medals.

Earlier in his career, Hotárek competed as a single skater and pair skater for the Czech Republic.

Personal life 
Ondřej Hotárek was born 25 January 1984 in Brno, Czechoslovakia. He moved from the Czech Republic to Italy in 2005 and became an Italian citizen in September 2010. In January 2012, he became a member of the sports group of the Italian police.

Hotárek's engagement to his girlfriend, Italian ice dancer Anna Cappellini, was announced in August 2014. The couple married on June 20, 2015, in Breccia, Italy. Figure skater Michal Březina was the best man at their wedding.

On July 2, 2021, Hotárek and Cappellini's first child, a girl named Diana, was born.

Early career 
Hotárek began learning to skate in 1989. He competed in men's singles for the Czech Republic. He became the 2003 and 2004 Czech national bronze medalist and appeared in international events.

Hotárek found the jump elements difficult, and believed his skill set would be better suited to pair skating. His first partner was Veronika Havlíčková. In January 2006, he teamed up with Laura Magitteri to compete for Italy. They were the 2007 and 2008 Italian national champions. Their partnership ended in January 2009.

Partnership with Berton 

Hotárek teamed up with Stefania Berton in early 2009. They won the silver medal at 2010 Italian Nationals and were selected to compete at the World Championships. They placed 11th in their debut at the event.

During the 2010–11 season, Berton/Hotárek won silver at the Nebelhorn Trophy and also debuted on the Grand Prix circuit, finishing sixth at Cup of Russia. They won their first Italian national title and were sent to the 2011 European Championships. They placed fourth in the short program and fifth in the free program, setting personal bests in both, and finished fifth overall with their best combined total to date, 164.83 points.

Berton/Hotárek began the 2011–12 season at the 2011 Ondrej Nepela Memorial, where they won the silver medal. In the Grand Prix season, they placed 4th at 2011 NHK Trophy and then won bronze at 2011 Rostelecom Cup, making them the first Italian pair to medal on the Grand Prix circuit. At the 2012 European Championships, they placed 4th, historically the highest Italian result in pairs.

In the 2012–13 season, Berton/Hotárek were assigned to the 2012 Skate Canada International and 2012 Trophée Eric Bompard. After taking bronze at both events, they won bronze at the 2013 European Championships, becoming the first Italian pair skaters to medal at Europeans.

Berton/Hotárek started the 2013–14 Grand Prix season at the 2013 Skate America and finished 5th. They won their first GP title at the 2013 Skate Canada and then finished 4th at the 2014 European Championships, behind Vera Bazarova / Yuri Larionov. Berton/Hotárek finished 11th in the pairs event at the 2014 Winter Olympics in Sochi, Russia.

For the 2014-15 season, Berton/Hotarek were assigned to 2014 Skate America and the 2014 Rostelecom Cup. On 2 July 2014, La Gazzetta dello Sport reported that their partnership had ended.

Partnership with Marchei 
On 2 July 2014, La Gazzetta dello Sport wrote that Hotárek and Valentina Marchei, a single skater, were considering a partnership. Bruno Marcotte confirmed on 26 July 2014 that the two were training together. They are coached by Marcotte in Montreal and by Franca Bianconi in Milan.

Marchei/Hotárek won the Italian national title in December 2014. In January 2015, they placed fourth at the European Championships in Stockholm, Sweden and 11th at the World Championships in March.

They ended their partnership in September of 2018.

Programs

With Marchei

With Berton

Single skating

Competitive highlights 
GP: Grand Prix; CS: Challenger Series; JGP: Junior Grand Prix

Pairs with Marchei for Italy

Pairs with Berton for Italy

Pairs with Magitteri for Italy

Men's singles for the Czech Republic

Detailed results

With Marchei

References

External links 

 
 
 
 

1984 births
Living people
Figure skaters from Brno
Czech male single skaters
Czech male pair skaters
Italian male pair skaters
Italian people of Czech descent
Czech emigrants to Italy
Naturalised citizens of Italy
Figure skaters of Fiamme Azzurre
European Figure Skating Championships medalists
Figure skaters at the 2014 Winter Olympics
Figure skaters at the 2018 Winter Olympics
Olympic figure skaters of Italy